The Liberation Monument is a monument in Pyongyang, North Korea. It was built in 1947 to honour Red Army soldiers who took part in capturing Korea from Imperial Japan during the final stage of the Second World War. Soviet paratroopers took control of Pyongyang on August 24, 1945. The monument is composed of a stele surmounted by a five-pointed red star, with the entire structure attaining a height of 30 meters. The square base of the monument bears an inscription on each of its sides. The text, in Russian and Korean, describes the purpose of the monument. The monument is often visited by official delegations as well as by tourists and city residents. It has become traditional for newlywed couples to visit the monument as well.

Inscriptions

Primary Russian text (Front side):
Великий советский народ разгромил японских империалистов и освободил корейский народ. Кровью, пролитой советскими воинами при освобождении Кореи, еще больше укрепились узы дружбы между корейским и советским народами. В знак всенародной благодарности воздвигнут этот памятник. 15 августа 1945 года.

English translation:

The great Soviet people defeated the Japanese imperialists and liberated the Korean people. The blood shed by Soviet soldiers during the liberation of Korea has served to strengthen the bonds of friendship binding the Korean and the Soviet peoples. This monument was erected to signify the gratitude of the Korean people. August 15, 1945.

Secondary Russian inscription (Back side)
Вечная слава великой Советской Армии, освободившей корейский народ от ига японских империалистов и открывшей ему путь к свободе и независимости! 15 августа 1945 г.

English translation:

Eternal glory to the great Soviet Army that liberated Korean people from Japanese imperialists and showed them the way to freedomy and independence! August 15, 1945.

External links

A photo of the Liberation Monument
Tourist's view on Pyongyang, includes some photos of the monument 

Buildings and structures completed in 1947
Buildings and structures in Pyongyang
Obelisks
1947 establishments in Korea
Korea–Soviet Union relations
Soviet military memorials and cemeteries